Abdul Malik Fadjar (22 February 1939 – 7 September 2020) was an Indonesian politician who served as Minister of Religious Affairs.

References

1930s births
2020 deaths
Indonesian Muslims
Indonesian politicians